Olivier Gourmet (born 22 July 1963) is a Belgian actor.

Gourmet was born in Namur.  He won the Best Actor award at the 2002 Cannes Film Festival for his role in Le Fils by Jean-Pierre and Luc Dardenne. He also appeared in La Promesse, Rosetta and L'Enfant.

Selected filmography

References

External links

20th-century Belgian male actors
1963 births
Living people
Cannes Film Festival Award for Best Actor winners
Magritte Award winners
Belgian male film actors
21st-century Belgian male actors
People from Namur (city)
Royal Conservatory of Liège alumni
Academic staff of the Royal Conservatory of Liège
Cours Florent alumni
Best Actor Jutra and Iris Award winners